Montfort is a former commune in the Doubs department in the Bourgogne-Franche-Comté region in eastern France. On 1 January 2017, it was merged into the new commune Le Val.

Geography

Population

See also
 Communes of the Doubs department

References

External links

 Montfort on the intercommunal Web site of the department 

Former communes of Doubs